Coleophora monticola is a moth of the family Coleophoridae. It is found in Namibia.

References

monticola
Moths described in 2004
Moths of Africa